Body and Blood of Christ may refer to:

Eucharist, a Christian rite considered a sacrament in most churches and an ordinance in others involving the consumption of bread and wine in memory of Christ
Blessed Sacrament, a devotional name used in the Latin Church of the Catholic Church, as well as in various other denominations
Consubstantiation, a theological doctrine that holds that during the sacrament, the fundamental "substance" of the body and blood of Christ are present alongside the substance of the bread and wine
Transubstantiation, a doctrine of the Catholic Church, the change of substance by which the bread and wine offered in the sacrifice of the sacrament of the Eucharist during the Mass, become, in reality, the body and blood of Jesus Christ

See also
Body of Christ
Blood of Christ
Corpus Christi (disambiguation)
The Sacrament of the Body and Blood of Christ—Against the Fanatics